"O Death Rock Me Asleep" is a Tudor-era poem, traditionally attributed to Anne Boleyn. It was written shortly before her execution in 1536 and after Queen Elizabeth I was born.

Authorship

The poem is generally attributed to Anne Boleyn, and is assumed to have been composed whilst she was imprisoned in the Tower of London. However, the evidence for Boleyn's authorship is not entirely conclusive. It has been postulated that the poem was actually written by Boleyn's brother Lord Rochford.

Analysis

The poem was written in the last days of Anne's life and is a reflection on her suffering. In it, she observes that her end cannot be avoided, and that it will at least give her peace and an escape from her present sufferings.

Structure

The poem has a fairly loose structure, with most lines either being tetrameter or trimeter. At the end of each major stanza, there is a refrain, varying slightly, about the nearing of death and how it is inevitable.

Text
O death! rock me asleep,
  Bring me the quiet rest;
Let pass my weary guiltless ghost
  Out of my careful breast:
Toll on the passing bell,
Ring out the doleful knell,
Let thy sound my death tell,
    Death doth draw nigh;
    There is no remedy.

My pains who can express?
  Alas! they are so strong,
My dolour will not suffer strength
  My life for to prolong:
Toll on, thou passing bell,
Ring out my doleful knell,
Let thy sound my death tell,
    Death doth draw nigh;
    There is no remedy.

Alone in prison strong,
  I wait my destiny,
Woe worth this cruel hap that I
  Should taste this misery?
Toll on, thou passing bell, 
Let thy sound my death tell,
    Death doth draw nigh,
    There is no remedy.

Farewell my pleasures past,
  Welcome my present pain!
I feel my torments so increase
  That life cannot remain.
Cease now,thou passing bell;
Rung is my doleful knell,
For the sound my death doth tell,
    Death doth draw nigh,
    There is no remedy.

References

1536 works
16th-century poems
Early Modern English poems
Anne Boleyn